Cen is the Mandarin pinyin romanization of the Chinese surname written  in Chinese character. It is romanized Ts'en in Wade–Giles, and variously as  Sam, Sum, Sham, Shum  in Cantonese, Gim, Khim, Chim in Taiwanese Hokkien and Chen in other pinyin forms. Cen is listed 67th in the Song dynasty classic text Hundred Family Surnames. As of 2008, it is the 235th most common surname in China, shared by 340,000 people. Cen is considered a rare surname. A person with a rare surname like Cen may be able to trace his or her origins to a single ancestral area.

Notable people
 Cen Peng (岑彭; died 36 AD). Han dynasty general.
 Cen Hun (岑昏; died 280). Government Minister of Eastern Wu.
 Cen Derun (岑德潤; circa 5th - 6th century), Southern Dynasties poet.
 Cen Wenben (岑文本; 595–645). Viscount Xian of Jiangling, Tang dynasty chancellor.
 Cen Changqian (岑長倩; died 691), Tang dynasty chancellor, nephew of Cen Wenben.
 Cen Xi (岑羲; died 713), Tang dynasty chancellor, grandson of Cen Wenben.
 Cen Shen (岑參; 715–770), Tang dynasty poet.
 Cen Yuying (岑毓英; 1829–1889). Qing dynasty Governor-General of Yunnan-Guizhou, Minister of Defense.
 Cen Yubao (岑毓报; 1841–?). Qing dynasty Viceroy of Yunnan-Guizhou, younger brother of Cen Yuying.
 Cen Chunming (岑春蓂; 1868-1944). Qing dynasty Hankow Taotai. Later governor of Jiangxi, Guizhou and Hunan, son of Cen Yuying.
 Cen Guangyue (岑光樾; 1876 - 1960), artist
 Cen Zhongmian (岑仲勉; 1885–1961), historian
 Cen Qixiang (岑麒祥; 1903–1989). Linguist
 Cen Feilong (岑飛龍; 1905–1997). Painter and calligrapher
 Cen Kefa (岑可法; born 1935), physicist, academician of the Chinese Academy of Engineering
 Cen Zhangzhi (岑章志; born 1946), physicist, Vice-President of Tsinghua University
 Cen Zeliu (岑泽鎏; 1912-1941), ace fighter pilot of Chinese Air Force during the War of Resistance-World War II, war hero and martyr 
 John Shum or Cen Jianxun (born 1952). Hong Kong actor and film producer
 Cen Xu (born 1952), Vice Admiral of the PLA Navy
Sam Hou Fai or Cen Haohui (岑浩輝, born 1962), President of the Court of Final Appeal of Macau
 Shum Kwok Pui or Cen Guopei (岑國培; born 1970), Hong Kong football player
 Harry Shum Jr. (岑勇康; born 1982), Costa Rica-born Chinese-American actor and dancer in Glee
 Cen Nanqin (born 1983), Female slalom canoer. Won gold medal in 2014 Asian Games in Woman's Slalom C-1 event.
 Eliza Sam (born 1984). Chinese-Canadian actress based in Hong Kong
 Yoyo Shum (岑寧兒; born 1984). Hong Kong singer, son of John Shum
 Lester Shum (岑敖暉), Former Deputy Secretary-general of the Hong Kong Federation of Students

Cen clan of Guangxi 
In Imperial China, large parts of Guangxi and Guizhou were ruled by the local tusis of Cen clan, such as Tianzhou or the Sicheng native prefecture (Sicheng tufu). The Cens are ethnic Zhuang, but how and when they became Zhuang is unclear. Genealogies from Ming and Qing dynasties state that the founding ancestor is Cen Zhongshu, the Song general from Zhejiang.

Prominent members include: 
 Cen Zhongshu (岑仲淑; 1015-1077). Song dynasty general
 Cen Shumuhan (岑恕木罕; circa 1340), aka: Cen Numuhan. In 1340, he was granted hereditary control over the Sicheng region in Guangxi by the Mongolian Yuan Dynasty Emperor Toghon Temür. He was given the title of Khan. In Chinese he was known as and used the word Han (汗) which is a derivative of the word Khan, which means "Supreme Ruler" of his territory. He had a younger brother named Cen Tiemur (岑鐵木兒). 
 Cen Boyan (岑柏颜; circa 1368), aka: Cen Bayan (岑百眼) or Cen Baiyan (岑百眼). He was known as and used the given name of the famous Mongolian generals named Bayan. In 1368, he surrendered to the advancing forces of the first Emperor of the Ming Dynasty, Zhu Yuanzhang, and as a route commander his command was changed to a prefecture and he was granted a seal and appointed a Tianzhou Prefectural Magistrate.
 Cen Tianbao (岑天保; circa 1368). In 1368, he surrendered to the first Emperor of the Ming Dynasty, Zhu Yuanzhang, and was made the Prefect of Tianzhou, Guangxi. He and the Cen clan had ancestors with Mongolian-style names due to their closed military, economic, social, and political ties with them
 Cen Meng (岑猛; 1496-1527). Chief of Tianzhou, Guangxi. Raised 100,000 man army of Han, Tang and Zhuang to defend area against Ming army colonization of Southern China.
 Cen Yidong (?-1789), Qing dynasty tusi of Tianzhou, Guangxi 
 Cen Chunxuan (1861–1933), Qing dynasty Viceroy of Liangguang
 Cen Deguang (1897–1945), politician of the Wang Jingwei regime, son of Cen Chunxuan

References

External links
Cen on ancestry.com 
 CJK UNIFIED IDEOGRAPH-5C91 - Wiktionary on Chinese characters information, glyph origin and dialectal pronunciation

Chinese-language surnames
Individual Chinese surnames